Disc film is a discontinued still-photography film format that was aimed at the consumer market. It was introduced by Kodak in 1982.

Technical details

The film is in the form of a flat disc, and is fully housed within a plastic cartridge. Each disc holds fifteen 10 × 8 mm exposures, arranged around the outside of the disc, with the disc being rotated 24° between successive images.

The system was a consumer-oriented product, and most cameras are self-contained units with no expansion capability. The disc film allows them to be compact and considerably thinner than other cameras. The cameras are very simple to load and unload, and are generally completely automated. The cassette has a built-in dark slide to prevent stray light reaching the film when the disc is removed.

As the film is rotated on a disc instead of over a spool, the cassette is very thin. The flat nature of the format also led to the potential advantage of greater sharpness over curved spool-based cassette formats (such as Minox film, 110 and 126 film). Disc film has a very thick acetate base, comparable thickness with 4×5" sheet film, which holds the film much flatter than the other formats of the time.

Performance and market reception

Disc film did not prove hugely successful, mainly because the image on the negative is only 10 mm by 8 mm, leading to generally unacceptable grain and poor definition in the final prints from the analog imaging equipment used at the time. The film was intended to be printed with special 6-element lenses from Kodak, but many labs simply printed discs with standard 3-element lenses used for larger negative formats. The resulting prints often disappointed the consumer. Few labs made the investment required to get the best out of the small negative size. A problem with labs of the time was the manual nature of processing the color negative film. This was essentially a manual process, unlike spool-based films, whose chemical processing could be fully automated.

There were several different manufacturers of Disc film.  Kodak produced films throughout the complete lifespan of the format, but 3M, Konica and Fuji also produced Disc film. While Kodak film was always eponymous, 3M and Konica made Disc film for many third parties, branded with the retailer's logo. As with most photographic film, for such white-label products the country of manufacture provides the best indication as to the actual manufacturer.

The film was officially discontinued by the last manufacturer, Kodak, on December 31, 1999, though the cameras had disappeared from the market long before then.

Legacy

The 1983 "Minolta Disc-7" camera introduced a predecessor of the selfie stick - a convex mirror on its front to allow the composition of self-portraits, and its packaging showed the camera mounted on a stick while used for such a purpose.

In 2012, Hèrm Hofmeyer in The Netherlands and Film Rescue International in Canada cooperatively developed a method to produce fresh disc films, and about 30 fresh B&W and colour discs were made. A detailed protocol on how to manufacture such discs at home was released in 2020.

Film history 

 Kodak: Kodacolor HR (1981), Kodacolor VR (1982–1991), Kodacolor (or Kodak) Gold (1992–1999)
 Fuji: Fujicolor HR series (1982–1995) and third party film. Manufactured in Japan.
 3M: HR film series (1982–1996) and third party film. Manufactured in Italy until the 1990s, then USA.
Konica: Konicacolor SR (c. 1983-86), SR-V (c. 1980s), SR-G (c. 1990-93). Also third party film. Manufactured in Japan.

References

Film formats
Kodak photographic films
Products introduced in 1982